Arthur Malburg Patrianova (born 22 April 1993) is a Brazilian handball player who plays for the Brazil national team.

Honours
Benfica
Portuguese Super Cup: 2018

External links
 Patrianova at TheFinalBall.com

1993 births
Living people
Sportspeople from Santa Catarina (state)
Brazilian male handball players
Expatriate handball players
Brazilian expatriate sportspeople in Spain
Brazilian expatriates in Slovenia
Brazilian expatriates in Portugal
S.L. Benfica handball players
South American Games gold medalists for Brazil
South American Games medalists in handball
Competitors at the 2014 South American Games
21st-century Brazilian people